Sir John McEwen,  (29 March 1900 – 20 November 1980) was an Australian politician who was the 18th prime minister of Australia, holding office from 1967 to 1968 in a caretaker capacity after the disappearance of Harold Holt. He was the leader of the Country Party from 1958 to 1971.

McEwen was born in Chiltern, Victoria. He was orphaned at the age of seven and raised by his grandmother, initially in Wangaratta and then in Dandenong. McEwen left school when he was 13 and joined the Australian Army at the age of 18, but the war ended before his unit was shipped out. He was nonetheless eligible for a soldier settlement scheme, and selected a property at Stanhope. He established a dairy farm, but later bought a larger property and farmed beef cattle.

After several previous unsuccessful candidacies, McEwen was elected to the House of Representatives at the 1934 federal election. He was first elevated to cabinet by Joseph Lyons in 1937. McEwen became deputy leader of the Country Party in 1940, under Arthur Fadden. He replaced Fadden as leader in 1958, and remained in the position until his retirement from politics in 1971. He served in parliament for 36 years in total, spending a record 25 years as a government minister.

The Liberal-Country Coalition returned to power in 1949, initially under Robert Menzies and then under Harold Holt. McEwen came to have a major influence on economic policy, particularly in the areas of agriculture, manufacturing, and trade. When Holt died in office in December 1967, he was commissioned as caretaker prime minister while the Liberal Party elected a new leader. He was 67 at the time, the oldest person to become prime minister and only the third from the Country Party. McEwen ceded power to John Gorton after 23 days in office, and in recognition of his service was appointed deputy prime minister, the first time that position had been formally created. He was Australia's third shortest serving prime minister, after Earle Page and Frank Forde. He remained as deputy prime minister until his retirement from politics in 1971.

Early life

Birth and family background
McEwen was born on 29 March 1900, at his parents' home in Chiltern, Victoria. He was the son of Amy Ellen (née Porter) and David James McEwen. His mother was born in Victoria, and had English and Irish ancestry. His father was of Ulster Scots origin, born in Mountnorris, County Armagh (in present-day Northern Ireland). He worked as a chemist, and also served a term on the Chiltern Shire Council. The family surname was originally spelled "MacEwen", but was altered upon David McEwen's arrival in Australia in 1889.

Childhood
In his memoirs, McEwen recounted that he had almost no memories of his parents. His mother died of lung disease in March 1902, just before his second birthday; she had given birth to a daughter, Amy, a few months earlier. She was the second of his father's three wives, and McEwen had three half-siblings – Gladys, Evelyn, and George. After their mother's death, McEwen and his sister were raised by their father, living in the rooms behind his chemist's shop. He died from meningitis in September 1907, when his son was seven. John and Amy were sent to live with their widowed grandmother, Nellie Porter (née Cook), while their younger half-brother went to live with his mother in Melbourne. They had never lived with their older half-sisters, who had been sent to live in a children's home upon their mother's death in 1893.

McEwen's grandmother ran a boardinghouse in Wangaratta. He grew up in what he described as "pretty frugal circumstances", and in 1912 his grandmother moved the family to Dandenong, on the outskirts of Melbourne. McEwen attended state schools in Wangaratta and Dandenong until the age of thirteen, when he began working for Rocke, Tompsitt & Co., a drug manufacturer in central Melbourne. He initially worked as a switchboard operator, for which he was paid 15 shillings per week. McEwen began attending night school in Prahran, and in 1915 passed an examination for the Commonwealth Public Service and began working as a junior clerk at the office of the Commonwealth Crown Solicitor. His immediate superior there was Fred Whitlam, the father of another future prime minister, Gough Whitlam.

Soldier-settler
With World War I ongoing, McEwen resolved to enter the military when he turned 18. He joined the Australian Army Cadets and completed a Royal Australian Navy course in radiotelegraphy, hoping to qualify for the newly opened Royal Military College, Duntroon. He passed the entrance exam, but instead chose to enlist as a private in the Australian Imperial Force, in order to be posted overseas sooner. The war ended before his unit shipped out. Despite the briefness of his service, McEwen was eligible for the Victorian government's soldier settlement scheme. He selected an  lot at Stanhope, on land that previously been a sheep station. As with many other soldier-settlers, McEwen initially did not have the money or the expertise needed to run a farm. He spent several months working as a farm labourer and later did the same as a stevedore at the Port of Melbourne, eventually saving enough money to return to Stanhope and establish his dairy farm.

McEwen's new property was virtually undeveloped, with only a single existing building (a small shack) and no fences, irrigation, or paddocks. He and the other soldier-settlers in the Stanhope district suffered a number of hardships in the early 1920s, including droughts, rabbit plagues, and low milk prices. Many of them were forced off their properties, allowing those who survived to expand their holdings relatively cheaply. In 1926, McEwen sold his property and bought a larger farm nearby, which he named Chilgala (a portmanteau of Chiltern and Tongala, the birthplaces of himself and his wife). He switched from dairy to beef cattle, and was able to expand his property by buying abandoned farms from the government. At its peak, Chilgala covered  and carried 1,800 head of cattle. McEwen had a reputation as one of the best farmers in the district, and came to be seen by the other soldier-settlers as a spokesman and leader. He represented them in meetings with government officials, and was secretary of the local Water Users' League, which protected the interests of irrigators. In 1923, he co-founded the Stanhope Dairy Co-operative, and was elected as the company's inaugural chairman.

Political career

Early years
McEwen was active in farmer organisations and in the Country Party. In 1934 he was elected to the House of Representatives for the electorate of Echuca.  That seat was abolished in 1937, and McEwen followed most of his constituents into Indi.   He changed seats again in 1949, when Murray was carved out of the northwestern portion of Indi and McEwen transferred there. Between 1937 and 1941 he was successively Minister for the Interior, Minister for External Affairs and (simultaneously) Minister for Air and Minister for Civil Aviation. In 1940, when Archie Cameron resigned as Country Party leader, McEwen contested the leadership ballot against Sir Earle Page: the ballot was tied and Arthur Fadden was chosen as a compromise. McEwen became his deputy.

Menzies and Holt Governments
When the conservatives returned to office in 1949 under Robert Menzies after eight years in opposition, McEwen became Minister for Commerce and Agriculture, switching to Minister for Trade in 1956. Menzies nicknamed him "Black Jack", due to his dark eyebrows, grim nature, and occasional temper. In the Menzies Government, McEwen pursued what became known as "McEwenism" – a policy of high tariff protection for the manufacturing industry, so that industry would not challenge the continuing high tariffs on imported raw materials, which benefitted farmers but pushed up industry's costs. This policy was a part (some argue the foundation) of what became known as the "Australian settlement" which promoted high wages, industrial development, government intervention in industry (Australian governments traditionally owned banks and insurance companies and the railways and through policies designed to assist particular industries) and decentralisation.

In 1958, following Fadden's retirement, McEwen was elected unopposed as leader of the Country Party. This made him the de facto deputy prime minister, and gave him a free choice of portfolio. Fadden had been Treasurer, but McEwen somewhat unexpectedly chose to continue on as trade minister. This allowed Harold Holt to become the first Liberal MP to serve as Treasurer; since then every Treasurer in a Coalition Government has been a Liberal. McEwen nonetheless had considerable influence in cabinet. He and his party favoured interventionist economic policies and were opposed to foreign ownership of industrial assets, which placed him frequently at odds with his Liberal colleagues. In 1962, a dispute between McEwen and Assistant Treasurer Les Bury ended with Bury being sacked from cabinet. His stature eventually grew to the point where he was considered a potential successor to Menzies as prime minister. An opinion poll in December 1963 showed that 19 percent of Coalition voters favoured McEwen as Menzies' successor, only two points behind the poll leader Holt. By December 1965, this number had risen to 27 percent, compared with Holt's 22 percent. McEwen's cause was championed by a number of media outlets, including The Sun and The Australian. Nonetheless, he had few supporters within the Liberal Party, and it was generally held that he would have to become a Liberal if he were to lead the Coalition, which he was unwilling to do.

Holt replaced Menzies as prime minister in January 1966, with McEwen continuing on his previous position. His portfolio had been expanded after the 1963 election, with his department now called the Department of Trade and Industry. McEwen enjoyed a "sound working relationship" with Holt, but without the same rapport he had had with Menzies. However, he had a poor relationship with William McMahon, Holt's replacement as Treasurer. They had philosophical differences over free trade and foreign investment, both of which McEwen opposed. McMahon was also suspected to be undermining McEwen through his connections in the media.

McEwen's most serious disagreement with Holt came in November 1967, when it was announced that Australia – which had converted to decimal currency the previous year – would not follow the recent devaluation of the pound sterling. This effectively marked Australia's withdrawal from the sterling area. McEwen issued a public statement criticising the decision, which he feared would damage primary industry. Holt considered this a breach of cabinet solidarity, and made preparations for the Liberal Party to govern in its own right in case the Country Party withdrew from the government. The situation was eventually resolved In Holt's favour.

Prime Minister

Harold Holt disappeared while swimming at Portsea, Victoria, on 17 December 1967, and was officially presumed dead two days later. The Governor-General, Lord Casey, sent for McEwen and commissioned him as interim Prime Minister, on the understanding that his commission would continue only so long as it took for the Liberals to elect a new leader. McEwen contended that if Casey commissioned a Liberal as interim Prime Minister, it would give that person an undue advantage in the upcoming ballot for a full-time leader.

McEwen retained all of Holt's ministers, and had them sworn in as the McEwen Ministry. Approaching 68, McEwen was the oldest person ever to be appointed Prime Minister of Australia, although not the oldest to serve; Menzies left office one month and six days after his 71st birthday. McEwen had been encouraged to remain Prime Minister on a more permanent basis but to do so would have required him to defect to the Liberals, an option he had never contemplated.

It had long been presumed that McMahon, who was both Treasurer and deputy Liberal leader, would succeed Holt as Liberal leader and hence Prime Minister. However, McEwen sparked a leadership crisis when he announced that he and his Country Party colleagues would not serve under McMahon.  McEwen is reported to have despised McMahon personally. More importantly, McEwen was bitterly opposed to McMahon on political grounds, because McMahon was allied with free trade advocates in the conservative parties and favoured sweeping tariff reforms, a position that was vehemently opposed by McEwen, his Country Party colleagues and their rural constituents.

Another key factor in McEwen's antipathy towards McMahon was hinted at soon after the crisis by the veteran political journalist Alan Reid. According to Reid, McEwen was aware that McMahon was habitually breaching Cabinet confidentiality and regularly leaking information to favoured journalists and lobbyists, including Maxwell Newton, who had been hired as a "consultant" by Japanese trade interests.

Even in the wake of their landslide victory in 1966, the Liberals were still four seats short of an outright majority. With only the Country Party as a realistic coalition partner, McEwen's opposition forced McMahon to withdraw from the leadership ballot. This opened the door for the successful campaign to promote the Minister for Education and Science, Senator John Gorton, to the Prime Ministership with the support of a group led by Defence Minister Malcolm Fraser. Gorton was elected as leader of the Liberal Party on 9 January 1968, and succeeded McEwen as Prime Minister the following day. It was the second time the Country Party had effectively vetoed its senior partner's choice for the leadership; in 1923 Earle Page had demanded that the Nationalist Party, one of the forerunners of the Liberals, remove Billy Hughes as leader before he would even consider coalition talks.

Later years

Gorton created the formal title Deputy Prime Minister for McEwen, confirming his status as the second-ranking member of the government.  Prior to then, the title had been used informally for whoever was recognised as the second-ranking member of the government – the leader of the Country Party when the Coalition was in government, and Labor's deputy leader when Labor was in government. Even before being formally named Deputy Prime Minister, McEwen had exercised an effective veto over government policy since 1966 by virtue of being the most senior member of the government, having been a member of the Coalition frontbench without interruption since 1937.

McEwen retired from politics in 1971. In his memoir, he recalls his career as being "long and very, very hard", and turned back to managing 1,800 head of cattle on his property in Goulburn Valley. In the same year, Clifton Pugh won the Archibald Prize for a portrait of McEwen. While he had softened in his "unequivocal support for protection" by the time of his retirement he had given way to free-traders with regards to agriculture. However, he felt differently about manufacturing, as it was essential to National power:"My own view has always been that it would be ridiculous to think that Australia was safe in the long term unless we built up our population and built up our industries. So I have always wanted to make Australia a powerful industrialised country as well as a major agricultural and mining country. This basic attitude meant that I was bound to favour broadly protectionist policies aimed at developing our manufacturing sector."At the time of his resignation, he had served in parliament for 36 years and 5 months, including 34 years as either a minister (1937–1941 and 1949–1971) or opposition frontbencher (1941–1949). He was the last serving parliamentarian from the Great Depression era, and hence the last parliamentary survivor of the Lyons government. By the time of his death, Malcolm Fraser's government was abandoning McEwenite trade policies.

Honours

McEwen was awarded the Companion of Honour (CH) in 1969. He was knighted in 1971 after his retirement from politics, becoming a Knight Grand Cross of the Order of St Michael and St George (GCMG). The Japanese government conferred on him the Grand Cordon, Order of the Rising Sun in 1973.

Personal life and death
On 21 September 1921, he married Anne Mills McLeod, known as Annie; they had no children. In 1966, she was made a Dame Commander of the Order of the British Empire (DBE). After a long illness Dame Anne McEwen died on 10 February 1967.

At the time of becoming Prime Minister in December of that year, McEwen was a widower, being the first Australian Prime Minister unmarried during his term of office. (The next such case was Julia Gillard, Prime Minister 2010–13, who had a domestic partner although unwed.)

On 26 July 1968, McEwen married Mary Eileen Byrne, his personal secretary for 15 years, at Wesley Church, Melbourne; he was aged 68, she was 46. In retirement he distanced himself from politics, undertook some consulting work, and travelled to Japan and South Africa. He had no children by any of his marriages.

McEwen suffered from severe dermatitis for most of his adult life. He recounted that "for literally months at a time, I would be walking about Parliament House with my feet bleeding and damaged." The pain became unbearable in later years, and he began refusing food in order to hasten his death; he died of self-imposed starvation on 20 November 1980, aged 80. McEwen was cremated, and his estate was sworn for probate at $2,180,479. He was also receiving a small pension from the Department of Social Security at the time of his death.

See also
McEwen Ministry

References

Further reading

External links

 
John McEwen at the National Film and Sound Archive
 

1900 births
1980 deaths
1980 suicides
20th-century Australian politicians
Australian farmers
Australian Freemasons
Australian Knights Grand Cross of the Order of St Michael and St George
Australian Members of the Order of the Companions of Honour
Australian members of the Privy Council of the United Kingdom
Australian military personnel of World War I
Australian ministers for Foreign Affairs
Australian monarchists
Australian people of English descent
Australian people of Irish descent
Australian people of Ulster-Scottish descent
Australian politicians awarded knighthoods
Australian politicians who committed suicide
Deputy Prime Ministers of Australia
Grand Cordons of the Order of the Rising Sun
Leaders of the National Party of Australia
Members of the Australian House of Representatives for Echuca
Members of the Australian House of Representatives for Indi
Members of the Australian House of Representatives for Murray
Members of the Australian House of Representatives
Members of the Cabinet of Australia
National Party of Australia members of the Parliament of Australia
Prime Ministers of Australia
Suicides by starvation
Suicides in Victoria (Australia)